Cola Howard Hudson (June 5, 1926 – January 20, 2008) was an American politician who served in the Vermont House of Representatives.

References

1926 births
2008 deaths
Republican Party members of the Vermont House of Representatives